Prunus texana, called peachbush, Texas almond cherry, Texas peachbush, sand plum, peach bush, and wild peach is native to central and western Texas. Although it looks like peach, it actually belongs to Prunus sect. Prunocerasus together with other North American plum species.

Description
The branches have short hairs. The flowers are white or pink. The fruits are egg-shaped and yellow or greenish yellow. The leaves are slender and elliptical with small teeth. The species readily hybridizes with native and cultivated plums.

Cultivars include 'Bolen', 'Gephart', 'Johnson', and 'Stuart'.

References

External links

 Photographs from University of Texas
 

texana
Flora of Texas
Plants described in 1840
texana
Taxobox binomials not recognized by IUCN